Enakkaga Kaathiru is a 1981 Tamil-language film directed by P. S. Nivas, starring Suman,  Sumalatha and Bhanuchander.

Soundtrack
The music was composed by Ilaiyaraaja.

References

External links 

1981 films
Films scored by Ilaiyaraaja
1980s Tamil-language films